Howard Overman is a British television writer, best known for creating the series Misfits which won the 2010 BAFTA Television Award for Best Drama Series and the police-procedural comedy Vexed.

Career
Overman has written scripts for serial dramas such as Hotel Babylon, New Tricks, Hustle, Harley Street and Merlin. In 2010 Overman created the BBC Four drama series Dirk Gently based on the novels by Douglas Adams. He wrote the script for the pilot and the first episode and also served as an executive producer. He created the BBC One fantasy drama Atlantis, first aired in autumn 2013, which ran for two series. It also managed to draw 1 million viewers away from then highly popular ITV show The X Factor, which aired at the same time in the UK.

In 2016 Overman made a return to E4 with his series Crazyhead, a co-production with Channel 4 and Netflix. Overman serves as an executive producer with his company Urban Myth Films. In 2019, he created and wrote a TV series adaptation of War of the Worlds based on the H.G. Wells novel but was a modern retelling. It was renewed for a second, and then, in July 2021, War of the Worlds was renewed for a third season, with production already underway. The third season is set to air in 2022. He adapted The One, John Marrs's 2016 novel of the same name, for Netflix in 2021.

Writing credits

Awards and nominations

References

External links

Year of birth missing (living people)
Place of birth missing (living people)
BAFTA winners (people)
Living people
British television writers
British male screenwriters
British science fiction writers
British male television writers
21st-century British male writers
21st-century British screenwriters